Schlieregg is a tiny village in Thun, Berner Oberland, Switzerland. It lies in the municipality of Sigriswil, not far from Thunersee.

References 

Villages in Switzerland